The tinkerbirds or tinker barbets are the genus Pogoniulus of the Lybiidae, the African barbet family of near passerines, which was formerly included in the Capitonidae and sometimes in the Ramphastidae. Tinkerbirds are widely distributed in tropical Africa.

List of species in taxonomic order

Supposed fossil remains of Late Miocene tinkerbirds were found at Kohfidisch (Austria) but are not yet thoroughly studied. It is not clear whether they belong to an extant genus, but given the late date this may well be so.

Footnotes

References
 Mlíkovský, Jirí (2002): Cenozoic Birds of the World, Part 1: Europe. Ninox Press, Prague.  PDF fulltext 

Barbets